Marianne "Mausi" Grant (19 September 1921 in Prague; 11 December 2007 in Glasgow) was a Czech-Scottish Jewish artist. Grant survived the Holocaust, imprisoned in three successive concentration camps by selling her drawing skills.

Life
Grant was the only child in a comfortable middle-class family who lived in Prague in Czechoslovakia . Her father was Rudolf Hermann, the manager of the foreign exchange department  of the Bohemian Union Bank in Prague. Hermann came from a large family of hop farmers from the village of  Czirima, near Szadek. Her mother was Anna née Rosner, a milliner  and one of three sisters from Moravia. The couple were married in 1920 and decided to settle in Prague. Grant was a indirect relative of the novelist Franz Kafka through her maternal uncle, Joseph Pollack who was married to the author's sister, Valli Kafka.

After primary school in Prague Grant attending the private Prague English Grammar School, universally known as "PEGS", where she learned to speak English.

Grant recreated the mural "Wall Drawings from the Childrens Block" for Yad Vashem for the "No Childs Play" exhibition in 1997

References

1921 births
2007 deaths
Scottish women artists
People from Prague
Holocaust survivors
Bergen-Belsen concentration camp survivors